The Case Closed anime, known as  in Japan, had spun off twelve original video animation series and six television specials since its debut on January 8, 1996 on Nippon Television Network System (NNS) in Japan. The anime special features its own original plot with the general theme focused on Shinichi Kudo who was turned into a child by a poison called APTX 4869, but continues working as a detective under the alias Conan Edogawa.

The Shōnen Sunday Original Animation series is a Case Closed original video animation series which is released directly to VHS and DVD. The OVA was available to order for those who were subscribed to Weekly Shōnen Sunday. Shōnen Sunday has released a new OVA yearly since 2000 with nine animations released as of March 2010. Shogakukan later collected the nine animations and released them into four DVD compilations with the title Secret Files.

The Magic Files is a second Case Closed original video animation series, which is released directly to DVD. A new Magic File has been released every year in April since the first on April 11, 2007, which contained four previously aired Case Closed episodes. Later Magic Files were released along with Case Closed films, containing an original plot with background ties to the theatrical Case Closed films. The fifth Magic File was released on April 16, 2012.

OVAs

Shōnen Sunday Original Animation

Magic Files

TV Specials

Secret File releases
The Shōnen Sunday Original Animation series were released yearly since 2000 with nine animations released as of March 2010. Shogakukan later collected the nine animations and released them into four DVD compilations titled Secret Files.

References

OVAs